Merton is an unincorporated community in Merton Township, Steele County, Minnesota, United States, near Medford and Owatonna.  The community is located near the junction of Steele County Roads 8 (Kenyon Road) and 9 (NE 50th Street).  Other nearby routes include Steele County Roads 10, 12, and 37.  Medford Creek and Rush Creek both flow nearby.

References

Unincorporated communities in Steele County, Minnesota
Unincorporated communities in Minnesota